The 2010–11 Pittsburgh Panthers men's basketball team represented the University of Pittsburgh in the 2010–11 NCAA Division I men's basketball season. They were led by eighth-year head coach Jamie Dixon, in his twelfth total year at the university. The team played its home games in the Petersen Events Center in Pittsburgh, Pennsylvania and are members of the Big East Conference. They finished the season 28–6, 15–3 in Big East play to capture the regular season conference championship. As the 1 seed in the 2011 Big East men's basketball tournament, they were upset by 9 seed Connecticut in their first tournament game. They received an at-large bid in the 2011 NCAA Division I men's basketball tournament as the 1 seed in the southeast region. They defeated 16 seed UNC Asheville in the first round before being upset by 8 seed Butler in the second round.

Outlook 
The  Pittsburgh Panthers finished the 2009 season 25–9, 13–5 in Big East play and lost in the quarterfinals of the 2010 Big East men's basketball tournament. They received an at–large bid to the 2010 NCAA Division I men's basketball tournament, earning a 3 seed in the West Region. They defeated 14 seed Oakland in the first round before being upset by 6 seed and AP No. 25 Xavier in the second round. Finishing at No. 20 in the final Coaches' Poll, Pitt returned four starters and the bulk of their reserves including 86% of its scoring and 88% of its rebounding. Pitt has been ranked in the 2010-11 preseason among the top ten teams in the nation, and among the favorites to win the Big East Conference, by multiple national publications.

The Panthers conducted a preseason tour of Ireland, going undefeated in several exhibition games played against national and professional teams.

At the Big East Conference media day on October 20, Pitt was selected by a vote of the league's coaches to finish first in the Big East Conference receiving 12 out of 15 possible first place votes. Pitt guard Ashton Gibbs received a preseason first-team all-conference selection. The Panthers were ranked fourth in the nation in the preseason USA Today Coaches' Poll and fifth in nation in the preseason AP Poll.

Season

Pittsburgh finished their out-of-conference schedule 12–1, losing only to Tennessee at the Consol Energy Center, home of the Pittsburgh Penguins.

As of March 7, the Panthers were ranked third nationwide in both polls. They finished the regular season at the top of the Big East Conference, with a 15-3 record in conference play.

The Panthers earned a number one seed in the 2011 NCAA Division I men's basketball tournament, the third overall seed in the tournament.

The Panthers used a balanced attack, with eight players averaging 4.9 points per game or more. Gilbert Brown and Brad Wanamaker both averaged over ten points a game, while Ashton Gibbs led the team at 15.9 ppg (eighth in the Big East).

Coaching staff

Recruiting

Roster

Schedule 

|-
!colspan=9 style="background:#091C44; color:#CEC499;" | Ireland Summer Competition Tour

|-
!colspan=9 style="background:#091C44; color:#CEC499;" | Exhibition

|-
!colspan=9 style="background:#091C44; color:#CEC499;" | Regular season

|-
!colspan=9 style="background:#091C44; color:#CEC499;" | Big East tournament

|-
!colspan=9 style="background:#091C44; color:#CEC499;" | NCAA tournament

|-

Rankings

Accomplishments

 Pitt won the 2010 2K Sports Classic benefiting Coaches vs. Cancer tournament championship in November 2010, defeating Maryland in the semifinals and Texas in the finals at Madison Square Garden.
Pitt head coach Jamie Dixon won his 200th game with a 61-46 win over American on December 22, 2010. With the victory, Dixon tied the all-time NCAA Division I record held by Mark Few and Roy Williams for the fastest coach to earn 200 wins by achieving the mark in only eight seasons. The achievement of winning his first 200 out of 255 games also ranked Dixon among the all-time top-15 for the quickest coaches to achieve 200 victories in regards to total number of games played.
 With a win over third ranked and undefeated Syracuse on January 17, 2011, Pitt started the Big East regular season 6–0 for the first time in school history, and ran its Petersen Events Center record against teams ranked in the top five of the AP Poll to 9–0.
 With a win at South Florida on March 2, 2011:
Pitt clinched at least a share of the Big East Conference regular season championship
The senior class of Gilbert Brown, Brad Wanamaker and Gary McGhee accumulated the most wins of any class in school history with 109 total wins.
With his 214th win, head coach Jamie Dixon became the all-time NCAA leader in wins through a coach's first eight seasons.
Brad Wanamaker became only the second player in school history to score 1,000 points, grab 500 rebounds, and give 400 assists.
Pitt finished a school record 7-2 in Big East road games
With a win over Villanova on March 5, 2011, Pitt won the outright Big East Regular Season Championship and tied a school record for Big East wins with 15.
 Junior guard Ashton Gibbs was named to the All-Big East first-team and senior guard Brad Wanamaker was named to the All-Big East second team.
 Senior guard Brad Wanamaker won the Big East Sportsmanship Award.
 Pitt received a number one seed in the 2011 NCAA Tournament for the second time in school history. The seed represented the third overall seed in the tournament.
 For the sixth straight year, Pitt won at least one game in the NCAA Tournament, the longest such active streak in the nation.
 2010-11: Head coach Jamie Dixon won the Sporting News National Coach of the Year award.
Ashton Gibbs and Brad Wanamaker were named Associated Press Honorable Mention All-Americans.

References

Pittsburgh Panthers
Pittsburgh Panthers men's basketball seasons
Pittsburgh Panthers
Pittsburgh Pan
Pittsburgh Pan